San José is a corregimiento in San Carlos District, Panamá Oeste Province, Panama with a population of 2,729 as of 2010. Its population as of 1990 was 1,436; its population as of 2000 was 2,167.

References

Corregimientos of Panamá Oeste Province